The Swedish Forest and Wood Workers' Union (Skogs o Trä) was a trade union representing workers in the forestry and woodworking industries in Sweden.

History
The union was established in 1998, when the Swedish Forest Workers' Union merged with the Swedish Wood Industry Workers' Union.  The union's president, Kjell Dahlström, claimed that the merger saved SEK 30,000,000.  Like both its predecessors, the union affiliated to the Swedish Trade Union Confederation.  On formation, it had 68,709 members, but this fell rapidly, along with employment in the industry, and by 2008 it had only 39,144 members.  In 2009, it merged with the Swedish Graphic Workers' Union, to form GS.

Further reading

External links

References

Swedish Trade Union Confederation
Timber industry trade unions
Trade unions in Sweden
Trade unions established in 1998
Trade unions disestablished in 2009